Scouting in Louisiana has a long history, from the 1910s to the present day, serving thousands of youth in programs that suit the environment in which they live.

Early history (1910-1960)
The first Boy Scouts of America (BSA) Troop in Louisiana was founded in 1910 in Monroe, LA by Isaac Cowden. The group of boys had formed the year before as "The Newsboy's Club" and met Sundays in the Knights of Pythias Hall on St. John Street.  This troop was among the first in the south.  The first Scout Master to be commissioned in Louisiana was Osee W. Zeagler.

In the days of segregation, five of the seven Louisiana councils maintained a separate summer camp for Negro scouts and the other two ran a special session at the regular council camp in order that black scouts would not be denied a camping program. In the period 1957-1967, each of the "Negro Scout Camps" were closed and the regular councils camps were integrated. Negro camps in Louisiana were: Camp Pioneer (Norwela Council), Camp Britton (Ouachita Valley Council), Camp Chenier (Evangeline Area Council), Indian Village Scout Camp (New Orleans Area Council), and Camp Carver (Istrouma Area Council).

In 1924, the Evangeline Area Council (#212) was formed. In 1917, the Minden Council  was formed, ending in 1919. In 1917, the Ruston Council was formed, ending in 1918. In 1917, the Minden Council  was formed, ending in 1919. In 1923, the Fourth District Council (#213) was formed, changing its name to the Ouachita Valley Council (#213) in 1925. In 1919, the Alexandria Council (#208) was formed, changing its name to the Attakapas Council (#208) in 1921. In 1923 the council changed its name to Rapides Parish Council (#208), and back to Attakapas (#208) in 1925. Attakapas (#208) dissolved in 1925, reforming in 1938. In 1917, the Baton Rouge Council (#211) was formed, changing its name to the East Baton Rouge Parish Council (#211) in 1922. It changed its name to the Istrouma Area Council (#211)  in 1924.

In 1923, the Choctaw Area Council (#210) was formed. In 1919, the Calcasieu Parish Council (#209) was formed, changing its name to the Lake Charles Council (#209) in 1920. It changed its name to the Calcasieu Parish Council (#209) in 1922. In 1925, Calcasieu Parish changed its name to the Calcasieu and Cameron Parishes Council (#209). In 1930, the Choctaw Area (#210) and Calcasieu and Cameron Parishes (#209) councils merged to form the Calcasieu Area Council (#209).

In 1917, the Minden Council  was formed, ending in 1919. In 1924, the Mississippi-Gulf Coast Area Council (#666) was formed, merging into the New Orleans Area Council (#214) in 1927. In 1924, the Old Hickory Area Council (#657) was formed, merging into the New Orleans Area Council (#214) in 1931. 

In 1916, the New Orleans Council (#214) was formed, changing its name to the New Orleans Area Council (#214) in 1927. In 1925, the ClaiBienWeb Council (#699) was formed. In 1921, the Shreveport Council (#215) was formed, changing its name to the NorWeLa Area Council (#215) in 1923. The ClaiBienWeb Council merged into the NorWeLa Area Council (#215) in 1923.

Recent history (1960-2010)
The Louisiana Purchase Council was formed from 2003 the merger between the Ouachita Valley and Attakapas councils. In 1999, the New Orleans Area Council (#214) changed its name to the Southeast Louisiana Council (#214).

Boy Scouts of America Today

Louisiana Purchase Council

The Louisiana Purchase Council serves 20 parishes in Northeast and Central Louisiana. Parishes include: Allen, Avoyelles, Caldwell, Catahoula, Concordia, East Carroll, Franklin, Grant, Jackson, LaSalle, Lincoln, Madison, Morehouse, Ouachita, Rapides, Richland, Tensas, Union, West Carroll, and Winn.

History
In 1917, the Ruston Council was formed, ending in 1918. In 1923, the Fourth District Council (#213) was formed, changing its name to the Ouachita Valley Council (#213) in 1925. In 1919, the Alexandria Council (#208) was formed, changing its name to the Attakapas Council (#208) in 1921. In 1923 the council changed its name to Rapides Parish Council (#208), and back to Attakapas (#208) in 1925. Attakapas (#208) dissolved in 1925, reforming in 1938.

The council was formed from 2003 the merger between the Ouachita Valley (#213) and Attakapas (#208) councils to serve Scouts in Northeast and Central Louisiana.

Organization
 Pioneer District: Ouachita, Morehouse, East Carroll, West Carroll, Richland and Madison Parishes.
 Thunderbird District: Union, Lincoln, Jackson, and Winn Parishes.
 Attakapas District: Allen, Avoyelles, Catahoula, Concordia, Grant, LaSalle, and Rapides Parishes.

Camps
 Camp T.L. James - near Downsville, Louisiana.
 Camp Attakapas  - approximately 35 miles NE of Alexandria, near Jena.

Order of the Arrow
 Comanche Lodge 254

Calcasieu Area Council

The Calcasieu Area Council serves the families and youth in five Parishes of Southwest Louisiana.

History
In 1923, the Choctaw Area Council (#210) was formed. In 1919, the Calcasieu Parish Council (#209) was formed, changing its name to the Lake Charles Council (#209) in 1920. It changed its name to the Calcasieu Parish Council (#209) in 1922. In 1925, Calcasieu Parish changed its name to the Calcasieu and Cameron Parishes Council (#209). In 1930, the Choctaw Area (#210) and Calcasieu and Cameron Parishes (#209) councils merged to form the Calcasieu Area Council (#209).

Organization
The Council is divided into three districts:  Pioneer District serves Lake Charles, Louisiana, and Jeff Davis Parish;  Cypress Knee District serves Calcasieu and Cameron Parishes;  Thunderbird District serves Beauregard and Vernon Parishes.

Camps
The Council's Camp is Camp Edgewood, located near DeQuincy, Louisiana.

Order of the Arrow
Quelqueshoe Lodge 166

Evangeline Area Council

The Evangeline Area Council (#212) serves Scouts in Acadia, Evangeline, Lafayette, Iberia St. Landry, St. Martin, St. Mary and Vermillion parishes.

History
In 1924, the council was formed.

Organization
Bon Temps District
Kuna Nisha District

Camps
 Lost Bayou Scout Camp
 Camp Brownell
 Camp Steen
 Camp Thistlethwaite

Order of the Arrow
Atchafalaya Lodge

Istrouma Area Council

Istrouma Area Council serves Scouts in 13 parishes in Louisiana (Ascension, East Baton Rouge, East Feliciana, Iberville, Livingston, Pointe Coupee, St. Helena, St. James, St. Tammany, Tangipahoa, Washington, West Feliciana and West Baton Rouge) and in Wilkinson County, Mississippi.  The Council is divided into six districts: Avondale, Bogue Tuchenna, Chappepeela, Cypress Chauve, Sewell-Eagle and Tunica.

Norwela Council

The Norwela Council of the BSA was established in 1923. It serves a nine-parish region: Bienville, Bossier, Caddo, Claiborne, DeSoto, Natchitoches, Red River, Sabine, and Webster.

History
In 1925, the ClaiBienWeb Council (#699) was formed. In 1921, the Shreveport Council (#215) was formed, changing its name to the NorWeLa Area Council (#215) in 1923. The ClaiBienWeb Council merged into the NorWeLa Area Council (#215) in 1923.

Organization

Neshota District
Netami District
Yatasi District
Cherokee District

Camp
 Kinsey Scout Reservation, south of Stonewall (fka Garland Scout Camp)

Order of the Arrow
Caddo Lodge

Southeast Louisiana Council

The Southeast Louisiana Council serves the Southeast Louisiana Parishes of Assumption, Jefferson, Lafourche, Orleans, Plaquemine, St. John the Baptist, St. Bernard, St. Charles, St. James, St. Tammany, and Terrebonne.

History
In 1917, the Minden Council  was formed, ending in 1919. In 1924, the Mississippi-Gulf Coast Area Council (#666) was formed, merging into the New Orleans Area Council (#214) in 1927. In 1924, the Old Hickory Area Council (#657) was formed, merging into the New Orleans Area Council (#214) in 1931. 

In 1916, the New Orleans Council (#214) was formed, changing its name to the New Orleans Area Council (#214) in 1927. It kept the name until 1999, when it changed to Southeast Louisiana Council.

Organization
Bayou District
Cataouatche District
Cypress District
Emerging Markets District
Fleur de Lis District
Pelican District

Camps

Order of the Arrow
Chilantakoba Lodge 

Before the devastation of Hurricane Katrina, Chilantakoba Lodge was the largest Order of the Arrow lodge in its section. The membership peaked around 600 but, following the storm, fell to nearly 100. The Council's camp, and much of the area it serves, was impacted severely. There were downed trees, damaged buildings, destroyed trails, and loss of many other assets on the council's property. Members of Chilantakoba Lodge helped in the resurrection of the Council Camp, Salmen Scout Reservation, and helped to staff the summer program, putting on three weeks of Boy Scout summer camp. It is this level of dedication, and desire to serve, that has caused Chilantakoba Lodge to produce five Lodge Chiefs who have later gone on to receive the Distinguished Service Award, the highest award for service to the Order.

Girl Scouting in Louisiana

Two Girl Scout Councils serve Louisiana.

Girl Scouts Louisiana East

Girl Scouts Louisiana East serves some 16,000 girls in 23 parishes.
It was formed by the merger of Girl Scout Council of Southeast
Louisiana and Girl Scouts-Audubon Council in April 2008.

Headquarters New Orleans, Louisiana
Website: ;
Service Center
Baton Rouge, LA

Camps
It includes a  lake.
It was founded in 1927.
McFadden Cabin is located in City Park (New Orleans)

Girl Scouts of Louisiana - Pines to the Gulf

It was formed by the merger of Bayou Girl Scout Council, Central Louisiana Girl Scout Council, Inc., Girl Scouts Pelican Council, and Girl Scouts Silver Waters Council in January 2008.

Headquarters Lafayette, Louisiana
Website 

Camps
Camp Indian Creek is in Chatham, Louisiana

Baden-Powell Service Association

There is one Baden-Powell Service Association local group in Louisiana, the 39th Cypress Scouts located in New Orleans.

See also

Southern Region (Boy Scouts of America)

References

Youth organizations based in Louisiana
Louisiana
Southern Region (Boy Scouts of America)